Pieter Hugo Kloppers (born 14 October 1988) is a South African rugby union player for the  in the Currie Cup and in the Rugby Challenge. His regular position is lock.

Career

Youth
He represented  at the Under-16 Grant Khomo Week in 2004 and at the Under-18 Craven Week in 2006.

He then joined  and played for their Under-19 team in 2007 and their Under-21 team in 2008 and 2009.

Varsity Cup
He was a regular for the  Varsity Cup team, playing for them in their title-winning seasons in 2009 and 2010, as well as in 2011 and 2012.

Western Province
His first start came a month later when he was selected as the starting lock in their match against .

Lions
He joined the  side for 2013.

Griquas
In July 2014, Kloppers was released from his contract with the Golden Lions and he joined Kimberley-based side  prior to the 2014 Currie Cup Premier Division competition, where he made nine appearances.

References

South African rugby union players
Living people
1988 births
Rugby union players from Worcester, South Africa
Golden Lions players
Western Province (rugby union) players
Rugby union locks